The 2020 Colorado State Rams football team represented Colorado State University in the 2020 NCAA Division I FBS football season. Originally, there was a cancellation of the 2020 season for the Mountain West Conference due to the COVID-19 pandemic, but this was reversed when the conference agreed to play a conference-only, eight game season. The Rams were to play their opening game at Sonny Lubick Field at Canvas Stadium in Fort Collins, Colorado against New Mexico, but the game was canceled due to virus restrictions. The Rams were led by first-year head coach Steve Addazio.

Previous season

The Rams finished the 2019 season 4–8, 3–5 in Mountain West play to finish in fifth place in the Mountain Division.

Preseason
Colorado State announced its 2020 football schedule on February 27, 2020. The 2020 schedule consisted of 6 home and 6 away games in the regular season. On August 10, 2020, the Mountain West Conference announced the suspension of the football season due to the COVID-19 pandemic. On September 25, the Mountain West announced the 2020 season would return with a revised 8-game, conference only season beginning October 24.

In August 2020, the university temporarily suspended the football program and initiated investigations into accusations of racism and verbal abuse of players by the coaching staff. However, the subsequent investigation found that the majority of athletes and staff disputed these accusations, and in October 2020, the investigation concluded and the team was cleared.

Wide receiver Warren Jackson was unanimously selected to the Mountain West Conference Preseason All-Conference Team, though he later opted out of the modified season to train for the NFL Draft. Tight end Trey McBride, linebacker Dequan Jackson, and punter Ryan Stonehouse were also named to the 2020 Preseason All-Conference Team.

Staff

Roster

 = Redshirted for the 2020 season. | Rs. = Redshirted in a previous season.

2020 Colorado State Football Roster

Pipeline states
States with five or more recruits on the 2020 roster:
Colorado (38 recruits)
California (13 recruits)
Florida (11 recruits)
Georgia (10 recruits)
Texas (6 recruits)
Louisiana (6 recruits)

Schedule
The modified schedule included a game vs. New Mexico on October 24 that was canceled due to COVID-19 restrictions. The November 21 game vs. UNLV was also canceled due to COVID-19 cases related to contact tracing within the UNLV program. The November 26 game at Air Force was also canceled due to COVID-19 cases related to contact tracing within the Colorado State program. The December 12 game vs. Utah State was canceled by Utah State University as a result of a Utah State player boycott in protest of comments made by their university president that they perceived as discriminatory.

Source

Game summaries

Fresno State

Wyoming

Boise State

San Diego State

Postseason

Awards
Mountain West All-Conference Selections
Scott Patchan, DE (First team)
Ryan Stonehouse, P (First team)
Dante Wright, WR (Second team)
Trey McBride, TE (Second team)
Dequan Jackson, LB (Second team)

Outgoing transfers
Colorado State lost 12 athletes to the transfer portal, per the Coloradoan.

References

Colorado State
Colorado State Rams football seasons
Colorado State Rams football